The men's 4x100m T42-46 event at the 2008 Summer Paralympics took place at the  Beijing National Stadium on 16 September 2008. There were no heats in this event.

Results

Final
Competed at 19:45.

 
WR = World Record. DQ = Disqualified (passing of the baton outside the take-over zone).

References
Official Beijing 2008 Paralympics Results: Final

Athletics at the 2008 Summer Paralympics